The Mandibles: A Family, 2029-2047 is a 2016 novel by American author Lionel Shriver. It was first published by HarperCollins in the United Kingdom in May 2016 through the company's Borough Press imprint and in the United States in June of the same year under their Harper imprint.

Synopsis 
The book is set in the United States in 2029 during a debt crisis that results in the collapse of the country's economy and the rise of a supranational currency, bancor, led by a group of countries. The United States is deliberately excluded from this group, a move that causes President Dante Alvarado to take drastic measures, which include resetting the national debt. Any and all gold now belongs to the government, and owning bancors will result in treason charges. Treasury bonds are now null and void, which results in the bankruptcy of many. One family, the Mandibles, are hit particularly hard by the devaluation of American currency, as they were all expecting to inherit an enormous fortune from the family's patriarch. Now they are unable to continue living in their former lifestyles and they are willing to go to any length to ensure survival.

The novel is divided into two parts. The first, which takes place between 2029 and 2032, establishes characters from four generations of the Mandible family: the wealthy patriarch; his children, now in their 60s; his young-middle-age grandchildren and their partners; and his teenage great grandchildren. The story begins with events just before the Great Renunciation and ends three years later with the family fleeing the chaos and social breakdown around their home in Brooklyn to live in upstate New York. The second part takes place in 2047, and follows the now middle-aged great grandchildren (and the patriarch's daughter, now in her 90s) as they strike out, once again, to find refuge from an increasingly authoritarian United States government in the separatist enclave of Nevada.

Critical reception 
The Irish Times commented that the book "can be accused of many things. It’s a bubbling, spitting pot of its author’s agendas, but laced with Shriver’s spicy intellect, her unapologetic eye for detail, her suitcase of deviant ideas, it is also a salient, spellbinding read." The Guardian and the Financial Times also reviewed the work, the latter opining that "Shriver’s intelligence, mordant humour and vicious leaps of imagination all combine to make this a novel that is as unsettling as it is entertaining".

In The Independent the book was described as "ambitious, but flawed". Ken Kalfus, writing for the Washington Post, criticized the book for being humorless and its reliance on expository dialogue. The Economist criticized the novel for similar reasons. Kirkus Reviews said that "[p]olitically, this may be the only novel Mother Jones and Breitbart can both take an interest in, though it might tire them both" and called it "[a]n imperfect but savvy commingling of apocalyptic and polemic."

Speaking about the book, Lionel Shriver said "I wanted to write a dystopic novel set in the very near future. But that's an established form and I needed to make my project distinctive. I didn't think there had been a lot of novels written about the dystopic economic future. Having, like the rest of us, gone through the whole 2008 financial debacle I thought I had plenty of material. My reading on what happened in 2008 is that we dodged a bullet. I feel as if that bullet is still whizzing around the planet."

References

2016 American novels
2016 speculative fiction novels
American speculative fiction novels
Books by Lionel Shriver
HarperCollins books
Fiction set in 2029